Dato' Seri Azlan bin Man (born 2 September 1958)  is a Malaysian politician and diplomat who served as the 9th Menteri Besar of Perlis from May 2013 and Member of the Perlis State Legislative Assembly (MLA) for Bintong from May 2018 to November 2022. He also served as the MLA for Pauh from May 2013 to May 2018. He is a member of the United Malays National Organisation (UMNO), a component party of the Barisan Nasional (BN) coalition. He has also served as the State Chairman of BN and UMNO of Perlis since April 2021.

Career
Azlan graduated from the University of Denver with a degree in international economics, before joining Malaysia's diplomatic corps.  His diplomatic posts included an appointment in 1999 as Malaysia's Permanent Mission Counsellor to the United Nations. In 2011 he was appointed the Deputy Director of the Public Complaints Bureau. He left Malaysia's public service in 2013 to return to his home state of Perlis and contest the state assembly seat of Pauh. He won the election and was immediately appointed as the state's Menteri Besar (Chief Minister), replacing Md Isa Sabu, who had not recontested his assembly seat. He was sworn in by King Sirajuddin on 7 May 2013.

In the 2018 elections, BN and Azlan (who this time contesting in Bintong) was again victorious in the state, and was sworn in for his second term as the Menteri Besar by the King of Perlis on 24 May 2018. However this time his appointment was controversial, as the ceremony was boycotted by other BN MLAs, who named Ismail Kassim as their Menteri Besar choice. The BN state chief, Shahidan Kassim, later that day announced that Azlan was sacked as UMNO and BN member, and become an independent; however Azlan disputes the announcement, saying he had not received official sacking letter from UMNO and he is still with UMNO and BN. The 9 BN MLAs later retracted their boycott of Azlan and announced their support for him, on 5 June 2018.

In the 2022 elections, Azlan was defeated by Perikatan Nasional-PAS candidate in Bintong, with BN wiped out of the state as none of their candidates won in the election.

Election results

Honours
  :
  Knight Grand Commander of the Order of the Crown of Perlis (SPMP) – Dato' Seri (2014)

References

Living people
1958 births
People from Perlis
Malaysian people of Malay descent
Malaysian Muslims
Independent politicians in Malaysia
United Malays National Organisation politicians
Chief Ministers of Perlis
Members of the Perlis State Legislative Assembly
Perlis state executive councillors
University of Denver alumni
21st-century Malaysian politicians